The 1964 North Dakota State Bison football team was an American football team that represented North Dakota State University during the 1964 NCAA College Division football season as a member of the North Central Conference. In their second year under head coach Darrell Mudra, the team compiled a 10–1 record, finished as NCC co-champion, and defeated  in the Mineral Water Bowl.

Schedule

References

North Dakota State
North Dakota State Bison football seasons
North Central Conference football champion seasons
North Dakota State Bison football